Uncial 059 (in the Gregory-Aland numbering), ε 09 (Soden), is a Greek uncial manuscript of the New Testament, dated paleographically to the 4th or 5th century.

Description 

The codex contains a part of the Gospel of Mark (15:29-38), on 1 parchment leaf. The text is written in one column per page, 19 lines per page.

The leaf designated by 059 came from the same manuscript as 0215 (Mark 15:20-21,26-27).

Text 

The Greek text of this codex is a representative of the Alexandrian text-type. Aland placed it in Category III.

History 

Currently it is dated by the INTF to the 4th or 5th century.

The manuscript was examined by Karl Wessely, Guglielmo Cavallo, and Pasquale Orsini. Gregory added it to the list of New Testament manuscripts.

The codex is located at the Austrian National Library, in Vienna. Leaf 059 has number of catalogue Pap. G. 39779, and leaf 0215 – Pap. G. 36112.

See also 
 List of New Testament uncials
 Textual criticism

References

Further reading 

 
 Karl Wessely, Griechische und koptische Texte theologischen inhalts, Studien zur Paläographie und Papyruskunde, (Leipzig 1912) reprinted (Amsterdam 1966), p. 243, no. 186.
 G. Cavallo, Ricerche sulla maiuscola biblica (1967), pl. 46b;

External links 

 
 LDAB

4th-century biblical manuscripts
Greek New Testament uncials
Biblical manuscripts of the Austrian National Library